The Terre-Neuve least gecko (Sphaerodactylus sommeri), also known commonly as the northwest Haitian banded geckolet, is a species of lizard in the family Sphaerodactylidae. The species is endemic to Haiti.

Etymology
The specific name, sommeri, is in honor of American entomologist William W. Sommer.

Habitat

Description

Reproduction
S. sommeri is oviparous.

References

Further reading
Graham ED (1981). "A New Species of Lizard (Sphaerodactylus) from Northwestern Haiti". Journal of Herpetology 15 (3): 363–366. (Sphaerodactylus sommeri, new species).
Rösler H (2000). "Kommentierte Liste der rezent, subrezent und fossil bekannten Geckotaxa (Reptilia: Gekkonomorpha)". Gekkota 2: 28–153. (Sphaerodactylus sommeri, p. 114). (in German).
Schwartz A, Henderson RW (1991). Amphibians and Reptiles of the West Indies: Descriptions, Distributions, and Natural History. Gainesville: University of Florida Press. 720 pp. . (Sphaerodactylus sommeri, p. 536).

Sphaerodactylus
Endemic fauna of Haiti
Reptiles of Haiti
Reptiles described in 1981